The Wallop is a 1921 American silent Western film directed by John Ford and starring Harry Carey. The film is considered to be lost.

Plot
As described in a film publication, John Wesley Pringle (Carey), an adventurer, returns to Gadsden to claim the girl Stella (Golden), only to find out that she is in love with Chris Foy (Steele).

Chris has been accused of a murder that he did not commit. Sheriff Matt Lisner (Le Moyne) searches Stella's house for Chris but finds out that he is hiding in the mountains. Sheriff Lisner and his crowd set off for the mountains to get Chris and claim a reward for his capture. John gets to the mountains by a back route and pretends to rescue Chris, but he surprises both the Sheriff and Chris by claiming the reward for himself.

John then orders Sheriff Lisner to release Chris, saying that this was all a ruse to rescue Chris and get him safely from the mountain top. John then reveals evidence which shows that Lisner is the real murderer, and Chris returns to Stella, while John goes on his way without ever revealing his love for the girl.

Cast
 Harry Carey as John Wesley Pringle
 Mignonne Golden as Stella Vorhis
 William Steele as Christopher Foy (as William Gettinger)
 Charles Le Moyne as Matt Lisner
 Joe Harris as Barela
 C. E. Anderson as Applegate
 J. Farrell MacDonald as Neuces River
 Mark Fenton as Major Vorhis
 Noble Johnson as Espinol

See also
 List of lost films

References

External links
 

1921 films
1921 Western (genre) films
1921 lost films
American black-and-white films
Films directed by John Ford
Lost Western (genre) films
Universal Pictures films
Lost American films
Silent American Western (genre) films
1920s American films